Jérémie is a French masculine given name, and the French version of Jeremiah. A common variant is Jérémy and its cognate in English is Jeremy. The name may refer to:

People
Jérémie Aliadière (born 1983), French football player
Jérémie Azou (born 1989), French rower
Jérémie Boga (born 1997), French football player
Jérémie Bonnelame (born 1938), Seychellois politician
Jérémie Carboni (born 1980), French director
Jérémie Colot (born 1986), French figure skater
Jérémie Elkaïm (born 1978), French actor
Jérémie Galland (born 1983), French cyclist
Jérémie Janot (born 1977), French football player and coach
Jérémie N'Jock (born 1980), Cameroonian football player
Jérémie Pauzié (1716–1779), Swiss jeweller
Jérémie Renier (born 1981), Belgian actor
Jérémie Zimmermann (born 1978), French computer scientist

Fictional characters
Jeremie Belpois, the protagonist in Code Lyoko

See also
Jeremie (name), given name and surname
Jérémy, given name

French masculine given names